Mira Mesa Senior High School (MMHS) is a public high school in the San Diego Unified School District. The school is recognized as a National Blue Ribbon School and a California Distinguished School. The school has an overall rating of 9.6/10 according to parents and students from the website greatschools.org. The school serves the Mira Mesa community as well as students participating in the San Diego Unified School Districts Voluntary Enrollment Exchange Program (VEEP).

History

Located in the northern portion of the San Diego city limits, Mira Mesa is located in an area once situated by Native American tribes. Due to much of the land being considered wasteland, it was not put to much use for years until in the early 1960s. Developers saw its potential to relieve the housing shortage San Diego was facing.

In 1974, a school bond issue was passed to help build the schools that the now full-fledged town of Mira Mesa sorely needed.  On September 13, 1976, Mira Mesa Jr./Sr. High School was opened and now serves grades 9-12, fed by the local Challenger and Wangenheim Middle Schools.

Since 1998, Mira Mesa High School has seen an increase in diversity among its students. As of the 2014–15 school year, the student body was composed at around 28% Filipino, 22% Hispanic, and 14% White.

In the spring of 2016 the school was re-accredited for another six years by the Western Association of Schools and Colleges (WASC).

Starting in 2019 major construction projects started on campus, including a new building replacing the bungalow units, and a new music building in the front of the school.

Athletics
Mira Mesa High School's Athletics programs include: Football,
basketball,
field hockey,
waterpolo,
swimming,
baseball,
soccer,
tennis,
cross country,
dance,
volleyball,
badminton,
softball,
wrestling,
lacrosse, track and field etc.

The Mira Mesa Wrestling team has won ten consecutive League Titles (2012-2021) and 21 overall. The team has also won ten consecutive San Diego City Conference (Willie Jones Jr. Memorial) Titles (2012-2021) and 18 overall. The wrestling team won its first ever CIF Championship (Division 1) in 2014, and finished CIF runner-up in 2005, 2019, 2020 and 2021. The Girls team was CIF runner-up in 2021.

Academics

SAT 
In 2019, the average score for the SAT Verbal test is 527. The average for SAT math being 582. The average SAT score overall was 1672, ranking highest in the city of San Diego.

Advanced Placement and Honors 
Mira Mesa High School offers a wide variety of AP and Honors classes. Classes range from AP Human Geography starting from 9th grade to subjects such as AP Literature for students in their senior year.

Language Programs 
Mira Mesa High School offers several language programs, including Spanish, French, and Filipino. Students at the high school are required to take at least two years of a foreign language class, while the school recommends 3 according to college acceptance standards.

College Attendance 
Mira Mesa High School has a relatively high post secondary education rate of 92% for the San Diego Unified School District. Most students attend the local University of California San Diego (UCSD) or San Diego State University.

Performing Arts
Drama
Technical Theatre This site is under development
Band/Marching Band Mira Mesa HS Band & Color Guard
Orchestra Mira Mesa High School Orchestras
Choir/Madrigals
Color Guard SCSBOA Championships 2008 - Mira Mesa High School Band
Dance/Drill Team
Mira Mesa High School's marching band, the Sapphire Sound, performs in field and parade competitions throughout Southern California in the fall. The Sapphire Sound was part of the Olympic band of the Sydney 2000 Olympics Opening Ceremonies. The band also performed in the Rose Parade in Pasadena, California on New Year's Day 2016 and 2022. The Sapphire Sound is the largest band in San Diego Unified School District, with over 200 students.

Mira Mesa High School music program consists of three bands: Concert Band, Symphonic Band, and Wind Ensemble. It also consists of two orchestra groups: Concert Orchestra and Symphony Orchestra.

 In 2017, the Wind Ensemble and Symphony Orchestra performed at the Kennedy Center in Washington D.C. And in 2019, these two groups performed at the Carnegie Hall in New York City.

Mira Mesa AFJROTC
Mira Mesa High School is home to the 936th Wing of the Air Force Junior Reserve Officer Training Corps (CA-936) which is one of the thirteen units contained within the San Diego Unified School District JROTC Joint Brigade. Established in September 1993, CA-936 has served Mira Mesa High School and the local community, participating in many community service events such as the annual Mira Mesa Street Fair and Fourth of July Parade.

Currently, CA-936 is led by two certified Aerospace Science Instructors consisting of a retired United States Air Force Major and a retired United States Air Force Master Sergeant. Cadet leadership within the wing consists of a thirteen-member "Senior Staff" led by a Wing Commander. The unit has four drill teams: a Sabre Team, an Armed Fancy Drill Team, an Unarmed Fancy Drill Team, and Color Guard. The program also boasts several special teams: a Cyberpatriot Team, an Awareness Presentation Team, an Academic Team, and a Youth Physical Fitness Team. The Wing has a friendly rivalry with Herbert Hoover High School's Army JROTC Group. They are also neighbors to the Scripps Ranch Air Force JROTC (CA-935) unit. In addition to being awarded the Distinguished Unit Award multiple times by Headquarters AFJROTC, CA-936 has twice been awarded the SDUSD Brigade's Stilwell trophy in 2001 and 2002.

The Witch Creek Fire

On October 22, 2007, many victims found shelter in the school gym, after they evacuated from the Witch Creek Fire and several other fires threatening San Diego at the time.

Notable alumni

 Chris Chelios (Class of 1978), NHL player, member of Hockey Hall of Fame
 Jessica Fischer (Class of 1992), soccer player
 Amon Gordon (Class of 2000), defensive lineman for Philadelphia Eagles
 Teyo Johnson (Class of 2000), pro football player, wide receiver and fullback for Calgary Stampeders (CFL)
 Jake Newberry (Class of 2012), baseball player
 Michael Pittman (Class of 1993), NFL running back for Arizona Cardinals (1998–2001), Tampa Bay Buccaneers (2002–2007), Denver Broncos (2008)
 Ray Rowe (Class of 1987), NFL player for Washington Redskins 1992-93
 Brian Awadis, Youtuber and co-owner of FaZe Clan
 Timothy Ta, Professional CS:GO Player for Evil Geniuses
 Lysley Tenorio (Class of 1990), short story writer, author of Monstress and recipient of NEA fellowship, Wallace Stegner fellowship, and Whiting Writers' award
 J. R. Tolver (Class of 1998), NFL and CFL player, wide receiver for Los Angeles Avengers (AFL)
 Damien Williams, running back for NFL's Miami Dolphins (2014-2017) and Kansas City Chiefs (2018–present)

See also
Primary and secondary schools in San Diego, California

References

External links
MMHS website
MMHS Band website
MMHS AFJROTC website

High schools in San Diego
Public high schools in California
1976 establishments in California